Al-Ghani or Ghaani (Arabic:الغنى) is an Islamic term and the meaning of Al-Ghani is Generous or Bountiful.

Ghaani may refer to:

People

Given name or mononym
Ghani Animofoshe (born 1985), Nigerien footballer 
Ghani Yalouz (born 1968), French wrestler and Olympian
Mullah Ghani, briefly governor of Nimruz Province, Afghanistan in 1995
Ghani Khan (Khan Abdul Ghani Khan, 1914–1996), Pashto language poet

Surname
Abdul Ghani, a male Muslim given name, including a list of people with the name
Ahmed Yasin Ghani (born 1991), Iraqi footballer of Kurdish descent
Aishah Ghani (1923–2013), Malaysian politician and government minister
Ali Ghani or Aly Goni (born 1991), Indian actor
Ashraf Ghani (Mohammad Ashraf Ghani Ahmadzai, born 1949), former president of Afghanistan
Cyrus Ghani (1929–2015), Iranian-born academic, lawyer, Iranian studies scholar, and film critic
Esmail Ghaani (born 1957), Iranian military commander
Hassan Ghani, (born 1985), Scottish broadcast journalist and documentary filmmaker
Karim Ghani, politician in South-East Asia of Indian origin
Nazneen Ghaani, Indian actress 
Nus Ghani (born 1972), British Conservative Party politician, Member of Parliament (MP) 
Owais Ahmed Ghani, former governor of the Khyber Pakhtunkhwa province of Pakistan
Rula Ghani, First Lady of Afghanistan and the wife of Ashraf Ghani
Tanveer Ghani, British Asian actor
Usman Ghani (born 1996), Afghanistan cricketer
Yusof Ghani (born 1950), Malaysian painter, sculptor, writer, professor and curator

Films 
 Ghani (2006 film), or The Cycle, a Bangladeshi film
 Ghani (2022 film), an Indian Telugu-language film

Other uses
Ghani (letter), the 26th letter of the three Georgian scripts

See also

 
 
Al-Ghani, one of the names of God in Islam
Goni (disambiguation), alternative transcription
Banu Ghani, an Arab tribe
Ghan (disambiguation)
Afghani (disambiguation)